Dilektaşı is a village in the Yüksekova District of Hakkâri Province in Turkey. The village is populated by Kurds of the Pinyanişî tribe and had a population of 731 in 2022.

The hamlet of Çalımlı is attached to it.

Population 
Population history from 2000 to 2022:

References 

Villages in Yüksekova District
Kurdish settlements in Hakkâri Province